The 2023 Ogun State gubernatorial election took place on 18 March 2023, to elect the Governor of Ogun State, concurrent with elections to the Ogun State House of Assembly as well as twenty-seven other gubernatorial elections and elections to all other state houses of assembly. The election—which was postponed from its original 11 March date—was held three weeks after the presidential election and National Assembly elections. Incumbent APC Governor Dapo Abiodun was eligible to run for re-election.

The primaries, scheduled for between 4 April and 9 June 2022, resulted in Abiodun being renominated by the All Progressives Congress on 26 May while for the Peoples Democratic Party, two separate parallel primaries were held on 25 May with one primary nominating Oladipupo Olatunde Adebutu—a former House of Representatives member—while the other primary picked Segun Sowunmi. The national PDP recognized the Adebutu-won primary in July 2022; however, that primary was annulled by a Federal High Court on 28 September. A Court of Appeal judgment on 28 November overturned the High Court ruling, reinstating Adebutu as the legitimate PDP nominee.

Electoral system
The governor of Ogun State is elected using a modified two-round system. To be elected in the first round, a candidate must receive the plurality of the vote and over 25% of the vote in at least two-thirds of state local government areas. If no candidate passes this threshold, a second round will be held between the top candidate and the next candidate to have received a plurality of votes in the highest number of local government areas.

Background
Ogun State is a small, Yoruba-majority southwestern state with vast natural areas and significant economic growth but facing a lack of affordable housing, an underdeveloped agricultural sector, and brain drain.

Politically, the 2019 elections were categorized as a reassertion of the state APC's control in the wake of a party rift that led allies of outgoing Governor Ibikunle Amosun to defect to the APM. Despite the defections, Abiodun won the gubernatorial race for the APC by a narrow 3% margin and the party won a majority in the House of Assembly. Federally, the APC swept all three Senate seats and won most House of Representatives seats. For the presidency, Ogun was won by APC nominee Muhammadu Buhari with about 50% but swung slightly towards the PDP. During the 2019–2023 term, the majority of APM elected officials returned to the APC, giving the party boosts in both the federal and state Houses.

Ahead of Abiodun's term, his policy focuses included security, public service and local government reform, unemployment, education, infrastructure, healthcare, and agriculture development as well as a pledge to complete in-progress projects from Amosun's administration. In terms of his performance, Abiodun was commended for proactive approaches to unemployment and the economy along with improving infrastructure in long-neglected communities along the Lagos State border but was criticized for the months-long delay in forming a cabinet, breaking a campaign promise to establish a university, and the failure to pay state government workers' co-operative deductions for over a year. Abiodun also came over fire after the Pandora Papers leaks revealed that he was illegally involved in two British Virgin Islands-based offshore companies.

Primary elections
The primaries, along with any potential challenges to primary results, were to take place between 4 April and 3 June 2022 but the deadline was extended to 9 June.

All Progressives Congress 
Analysts viewed the APC gubernatorial primary as a battle between factions within the Ogun APC, namely: the faction led by former Governor and current Ogun Central Senator Ibikunle Amosun, former Governor Olusegun Osoba's group, former Governor Gbenga Daniel's faction, incumbent Governor Dapo Abiodun's bloc, and the group of Lagos West Senator Solomon Olamilekan Adeola. The two most powerful groups appeared to be the Abiodun and Amosun factions, the same groups from the 2019 primary where Abiodun prevailed and much of Amosun's faction temporarily left to run under the Allied Peoples Movement. Tensions between the factions reached a head in late 2021 when Amosun's faction held a parallel party conference and elected separate leadership to Abiodun's bloc; but national APC leadership later accepted the results of the Abiodun factional congress as legitimate. Despite this setback, Amosun's allies continued their efforts to unseat Abiodun as Adekunle Akinlade and Ramoni Olalekan Mustapha looked set to challenge him until Mustapha joined Abiodun's faction in May 2022. Akinlade, who lost the 2019 primary to Abiodun before defecting and losing in the general as well, continued his campaign with pundits casting the primary as a potentially defining matchup between Amosun and Abiodun.

In the days before the primary, Abiodun's opponents rejected the process that led to the election of delegates. They claimed their respective supporters were denied the opportunity to vote despite purchasing forms for the delegates elections. The aspirants rejected the final delegates list and criticized the appointed primary committee chairman as biased. On the primary date, the six candidates contested an indirect primary at the MKO Abiola Stadium that ended with Abiodun winning unanimously. In his acceptance speech, Abiodun thanked the state and vowed to continue the work of his first term. About a month later, a number of Amosun allies led by Akinlade defected to the PDP with Akinlade becoming the party's deputy gubernatorial nominee. Around the same time, incumbent Deputy Governor Noimot Salako-Oyedele was renominated as the APC deputy gubernatorial nominee.

Nominated 
 Dapo Abiodun: Governor (2019–present)
Running mate—Noimot Salako-Oyedele: Deputy Governor (2019–present)

Eliminated in primary 
 Adekunle Akinlade: former House of Representatives member for Egbado South/Ipokia (2015–2019) and 2019 APC gubernatorial candidate and APM gubernatorial nominee (defected after to the primary to become PDP deputy gubernatorial nominee)
 Remi Bakare
 Owodunni Opayemi: businessman
 Biyi Otegbeye: businessman
 Modele Sarafa-Yusuf: entrepreneur and former broadcast journalist

Declined 
 Solomon Olamilekan Adeola: Senator for Lagos West (2015–present), former House of Representatives member for Alimosho (2011–2015), and former Lagos State House of Assembly member for Alimosho II (2003–2011)
 Gboyega Nasir Isiaka: 2019 ADC gubernatorial nominee, 2015 PDP gubernatorial nominee, and former Governor Gbenga Daniel administration aide
 Ramoni Olalekan Mustapha: Senator for Ogun East (2007–2011; 2019–present)

Results

People's Democratic Party 
Analysts viewed the PDP gubernatorial primary as another contest between the two major internal party groupings, the faction led by former MHR Oladipupo Olatunde Adebutu and the other faction being the remnants of late Senator Buruji Kashamu's supporters. While Adebutu spent 2021 and early 2022 preparing for another gubernatorial run, some in the Kashamu camp backed Segun Sowunmi's candidacy.

The weeks before the primary were dominated by party infighting and lawsuits between the factions. On the primary date, two separate factional primaries were held with one faction holding a primary at the Olusegun Obasanjo Presidential Library while the faction held a primary at the state Nigeria Union of Journalists secretariat in Abeokuta. While the NUJ secretariat primary was peacefully held and resulted in Segun Sowunmi's victory, the presidential library primary was marred by violence and gunshots as supporters of Oladipupo Olatunde Adebutu and Jimi Lawal clashed over the delegate list; eventually Lawal walked out in protest and the election ended in Adebutu winning unanimously. After the results were released, Lawal called for the primary to be annulled in a letter to the national PDP. A few days after the primaries, the PDP National Working Committee issued a certificate of return to Adebutu but Sowunmi continued to contend that his primary is legitimate. For his part, Adebutu began a reconciliation process in early June before picking Adekunle Akinlade as his running mate a month later. Despite the process, Lawal continued with his lawsuit to annul the primary; the case was initially successful and the primary was annulled on 27 September by a Federal High Court based on irregularities in violation of the Electoral Act. However, a Court of Appeal in Ibadan overturned the High Court ruling and reinstated Adebutu as nominee. In January, a Supreme Court panel affirmed the Court of Appeal ruling in favor of Adebutu.

Nominated 
 Oladipupo Olatunde Adebutu: former House of Representatives member for Remo/Shagamu/Ikenne (2015–2019) and 2019 PDP gubernatorial candidate
Running mate—Adekunle Akinlade: 2023 APC gubernatorial candidate, former House of Representatives member for Egbado South/Ipokia (2015–2019), and 2019 APC gubernatorial candidate and APM gubernatorial nominee

Eliminated 
 Abimbola Abodunrin
 Jimi Lawal: former Kaduna State Governor Nasir Ahmad el-Rufai aide and 2019 APC gubernatorial candidate
 Segun Sowunmi: Atiku Abubakar 2019 presidential campaign spokesman

Withdrew 
 David Bamgbose: 2015 APGA gubernatorial nominee (defected after the primary to obtain the PRP nomination)

Results

Minor parties 

 Abayomi Monsuru Omosanya (Accord)
Running mate: Bashirat Folashade Adenekan
 Samuel Olufemi Adeyemi (Action Alliance)
Running mate: Safiat Iskil-Ogunyomi
 Kazeem Shokunbi (Action Democratic Party)
Running mate: Oluronke Morenikeji Oseni
 Olufemi Omoshile Falana (Action Peoples Party)
Running mate: Basirat Oluwatosin Ijaola
 Adeyemi Harrison (African Action Congress)
Running mate: Olubukola Oloniyo
 Olubiyi Otegbeye (African Democratic Congress)
Running mate: Olatunde Awonuga
 Jolaoluwa Olutosin (Allied Peoples Movement)
Running mate: Sulaymon Abiola Bisiriyu
 TBD (Labour Party)
Running mate: TBD
 Olufemi Ajadi Oguntoyinbo (New Nigeria Peoples Party)
Running mate: Shakirat Oluwakemi Idris Arowolo
 Tofunmi Ogunrombi (National Rescue Movement)
Running mate: Femi Branch
 Cyrus Oluwaseun Johnson (People's Redemption Party)
Running mate: Remilekun Bolaji Quadri
 Tony Ojeshina (Social Democratic Party)
Running mate: Idowu Oluyemi Olugbenga

Campaign
As the general election campaign began in June 2022, pundits focused on the major candidates' attempts to unify their parties in the wake of the party primaries. Both Abiodun and Adebutu started party reconciliation processes but both faced difficulties; the most major post-primary change was the sudden defection of Adekunle Akinlade and other allies of former Governor Ibikunle Amosun from the APC to the PDP with Akinlade emerging as Adebutu's running mate. Despite the PDP's poor showing in 2019, analysts noted the political clout that the defectors held while the APC publicly recorded its indifference. However, by August, the APC set up reconciliation efforts to prevent further defections but the moves were impacted by the Amosun-Abiodun feud publicly reigniting after Amosun alleged that the 2019 election was rigged against Akinlade with Abiodun replying that Amosun had "self-delusion." For the PDP, observers noted that internal crises had negatively affected the party in every gubernatorial election since 2011 as the nominees of unrecognized factions continued to claim to be the legitimate PDP nominee.

In September, while continuing to dismiss intraparty rival Segun Sowunmi's claim to the nomination, Adebutu and the PDP become controversial for a leaked document outlining their attempt to consolidate the alliance with the Akinlade-led defectors. To secure the alliance, Adebutu and Akinlade had signed an agreement in June that had delineated the amount of appointed offices and nominations that would be filled by Akinlade group members. In the wake of the leak, the PDP defended the document as a "memorandum of understanding" to facilitate more cohesive governance and campaigning but critics attacked the paper as an attempt by Adebutu and Akinlade to corruptly divide "positions and resources among their cronies." These dynamics took a backseat to court drama a few days later, when a case from losing primary aspirants led a High Court to annul the PDP primary and order the party to conduct a new primary. The PDP did not organize a new primary, instead appealing the ruling as Adebutu continued to claim to be the rightful nominee amid further counterclaims and court battles. Also in early October, former Governor Amosun snubbed both Abiodun and the Adebutu-Akinlade ticket in revealing his endorsement of ADC nominee Olubiyi Otegbeye.

In the wake of the deepening PDP crisis and Amosun's endorsement of Otegbeye, journalists reported in November that Abiodun could be on track for a comfortable victory due to the divided opposition and support from traditional leaders. However, following weeks brought a massive shifts to the race as a Federal High Court ruling disqualified Otegbeye and all other Osun ADC nominees for the party's improper nomination processes while a Court of Appeal decision reinstated Adebutu as the legitimate PDP nominee. Although Adebutu was reinstated (and later confirmed by a Supreme Court ruling in January), internal PDP opponents vowed to continue their efforts against him as pundits noted that the infighting could still pose a major risk for the Adebutu campaign. By January, Otegbeye was also reinstated by a court appeal as legitimate nominee with pundits swiftly reviewing his renewed campaign and its prospects.

The next month, attention largely switched to the presidential election on 25 February. In the election, Ogun State voted for Bola Tinubu (APC); Tinubu won 58.9% of the vote to defeat Atiku Abubakar (PDP) at 21.4% and Peter Obi (LP) at 14.8%. Although the result was unsurprising as Ogun is in Tinubu's southwestern base and projections had favored him, the totals led to increased faith in Abiodun's chances due to Tinubu's wide margin of victory. On the other hand, gubernatorial campaign analysis reiterated the potential impact of the split in the former APC base between Abiodun and Otegbeye (who by this point was regarded as a major contender). Despite the APC split, the EiE-SBM forecast projected Abiodun to win based on the "overwhelming victory" of Tinubu. Other reports noted regional dynamics in addition to internal party crises.

Projections

Conduct

Electoral timetable

General election

Results

By senatorial district 
The results of the election by senatorial district.

By federal constituency
The results of the election by federal constituency.

By local government area 
The results of the election by local government area.

See also 
 2023 Nigerian elections
 2023 Nigerian gubernatorial elections

Notes

References 

Ogun State gubernatorial election
2023
2023 Ogun State elections
Ogun